The Winslow Township School District is a comprehensive community public school district that serves students in pre-kindergarten through twelfth grade from Winslow Township, in Camden County, New Jersey, United States. The district operates four elementary schools (grades PreK-3), two upper elementary schools (grades 4-6), one middle school (grades 7-8) and one high school (grades 9-12).

As of the 2018–19 school year, the district, comprising eight schools, had an enrollment of 4,650 students and 456.0 classroom teachers (on an FTE basis), for a student–teacher ratio of 10.2:1.

The district is classified by the New Jersey Department of Education as being in District Factor Group "CD", the sixth-highest of eight groupings. District Factor Groups organize districts statewide to allow comparison by common socioeconomic characteristics of the local districts. From lowest socioeconomic status to highest, the categories are A, B, CD, DE, FG, GH, I and J.

Students from Chesilhurst attend the district's schools as part of a sending/receiving relationship with the Chesilhurst Borough School District. The Chesilhurst district had served public school students in kindergarten through sixth grade at Shirley B. Foster Elementary School until the completion of the 2008-09 school year, after which the district was no longer operating any schools and began sending all of its students to the Winslow Township district as part of an expansion of the pre-existing sending/receiving relationship that commenced in the 2009-10 school year.

History
The district was formed in 1998, after voters approved a split from the Lower Camden County Regional School District, creating the Edgewood (later renamed Winslow) middle and high schools in 2001 to accompany the previously existing K-6 operation.

Winslow Township High School gained national attention in 2006 because of a shooting plot which was to take place during a lunch period. A student became aware of the plot and alerted school officials who in turn notified the Winslow Township Police Department. The students involved were arrested before the plot could be carried out. The only subject to be sentenced at this point has received four years probation and must undergo counseling and psychological evaluations.

Schools
Schools in the district (with 2018–19 enrollment data from the National Center for Education Statistics) are:

Elementary schools
Winslow Township Elementary School No. 1 (with 350 students; in grades PreK-3)
Sharon Thomas-Galloway, Principal
Winslow Township Elementary School No. 2 (349; PreK-3)
Lori Kelly, Principal
Winslow Township Elementary School No. 3 (390; PreK-3)
Tamika Gilbert-Floyd, Principal
Winslow Township Elementary School No. 4 (508; PreK-3)
Sheresa Clement, Principal
Winslow Township Elementary School No. 5 (566; 4-6)
Dr. Nython Carter, Principal
Winslow Township Elementary School No. 6 (483; 4-6)
Glen M. Jackson Sr., Principal
Middle school
Winslow Township Middle School (720; 7-8)
Stella Nwanguma, Principal
High school
Winslow Township High School (1,180; 9-12)
Kurtis Marella, Principal

Administration
The superintendent is H. Major Poteat. The Board Secretary / Business Administrator is Tyra McCoy-Boyle.

Board of education
The district's board of education, with nine members, sets policy and oversees the fiscal and educational operation of the district through its administration. As a Type II school district, the board's trustees are elected directly by voters to serve three-year terms of office on a staggered basis, with three seats up for election each year held (since 2012) as part of the November general election.

References

External links
Winslow Township School District
 
School Data for the Winslow Township School District, National Center for Education Statistics

Chesilhurst, New Jersey
Winslow Township, New Jersey
New Jersey District Factor Group CD
School districts in Camden County, New Jersey
School districts established in 1998